Edward Fox may refer to:
 Edward Fox (painter) (c. 1788 – 1875), British impressionist painter
 Edward Fox (actor) (born 1937), English actor
 Edward Fox (author) (born 1958), American author
 Edward Fox (judge) (1815–1881), American judge
 Edward Fox (MP), member of Parliament for Bishop's Castle
 Edward Foxe (c. 1496 – 1538), English bishop
 Edward Long Fox (psychiatrist) (1761–1835), British psychiatrist
 Edward Long Fox (physician) (1832–1902), English physician
 Edward Lane Fox, private secretary to Prince Harry
 J. Edward Fox (born 1948), US State Dept. official